Holly Matthews (née Wilkinson; born 13 October 1984) is an English actress and vlogger. From 1995 to 2003, she portrayed the role of Emma Miller in the BBC series Byker Grove.

Career
Matthews started her career in the BBC children's drama Byker Grove, portraying the role of Emma Miller from 1995 to 2003. In 2003, she left the series to pursue a singing career after signing to Sony UK, and released a single, "Little Miss Perfect". The song's instrumentation consists of a guitar and synthesiser. An editor from Cambridge News noted that "Little Miss Perfect" is reminiscent of songs released by Canadian recording artist, Avril Lavigne. However, they felt that it was "not the worst single ever made", although "not one you're likely to remember either." Matt Gray of The Digital Fix wrote that the song "doesn't quite scan", and joked that it has "all the ferocity and attitude of a cute ickle Care Bear. He also felt that "Amy Studt and Avril Lavigne do it a lot better" and went on to describe it as a "bland, uninspired pop tune". "Little Miss Perfect" peaked at number 32 on the UK Singles Chart in the week dated 28 February 2004.

Matthews attended the British drama school East 15 in 2005, and left after winning a high-profile role in the BBC drama Waterloo Road, playing the bully Leigh-Ann Galloway. Since that role, Matthews has continued to act in BBC's Doctors, playing Connie Whitfield; in ITV's The Bill playing drug addict Josie Clarke; and she was back in Doctors in 2009, playing Tansy Flack.

Away from her acting career, Matthews works as a self development coach. In November 2016, she launched her flagship online, self-development course The Bossing it! Academy. 

After the death of her husband, Matthews launched The Happy Me Project online, her straight talking brand of self development.

Matthews is a Huffington Post blogger, and was personally asked by Arianna Huffington to write for Thrive Global. Matthews is also a paid vlogger, creating content for Channel Mum.

Filmography

Personal life
Matthews gave birth five weeks early to a daughter, Brooke, early in 2011. At five months old, Brooke was diagnosed with meningitis, which Matthews herself had at seven years old. In October 2016,  a video showing Brooke telling off the Prime Minister of the United Kingdom, Theresa May, went viral. Matthews also has a daughter called Texas born in 2013.

On 29 July 2017, Matthews' husband Ross Blair, son of Andy Blair and brother of Matty Blair, died from a brain tumour. Matthews has raised more than £11,000 for the Warwickshire hospice where her husband spent his final days.

References

External links
 
 

English television actresses
1984 births
Living people
English bloggers
British women bloggers
Actresses from Newcastle upon Tyne